"Bubba Shot the Jukebox" is a song written by Dennis Linde, and recorded by American country music singer Mark Chesnutt.  It was released in September 1992 as the third single from his album Longnecks & Short Stories.  It peaked at number 4 on the U.S. Billboard Hot Country Singles & Tracks chart and at number 14 on the Canadian RPM Country Tracks chart.

Content
The song is an uptempo, in which a man named Bubba shoots a jukebox when he hears a song that makes him cry, which causes a scene. Bubba is taken to jail.

Chart performance
"Bubba Shot the Jukebox" charted for several weeks prior to its release, due to several stations giving it unsolicited airplay while "I'll Think of Something" was Chesnutt's active single. A column in Billboard described the song as "not thought to be viable for radio
by some in both Chesnutt's and MCA's camps", but that the unsolicited airplay made it "destined" to be a single.

Certifications

References

Songs about jukeboxes
Songs about prison
1992 singles
1992 songs
Mark Chesnutt songs
Songs written by Dennis Linde
Song recordings produced by Mark Wright (record producer)
MCA Records singles